Paolo Duval Goltz (born 12 May 1985) is an Argentine professional footballer who plays as a centre-back for Argentine Primera División club Colón.

Career

Huracan
He came to the club from Atlético Hasenkamp in 2001 and made the lower divisions in the entity of Parque de los Patricios. He made his debut in First on November 24, 2002 in the match between Huracán and Gimnasia and Esgrima La Plata that ended 0-0.1 Carlos Babington was the team's coach. But it continued with the arrival of Omar Labruna to the club in 2004. He won ownership when he returned to the First Division of the Globe in 2007 under the technical direction of Antonio Mohamed. They ratified it in the central defense Osvaldo Ardiles and later Claudio Ubeda. He was appointed captain of the team as of Apertura 2008, and was captain and benchmark of the team formed by Ángel Cappa called "Los Ángeles de Cappa" in Clausura 2009. From his debut to the end of Apertura 2009, he has recorded 166 games played with 30 goals.

Lanus
After eight years playing for Huracán, Goltz joined Lanús in July 2010 in a US$2 million deal. Goltz captained Lanús to their first Copa Sudamericana championship in 2013, scoring in the first leg of the final against Ponte Preta of Brazil.

In December 2013, he was awarded the 2013 South American Cup with Lanús, acting as captain and as one of its main figures; so much so that he was chosen as a defender of the Ideal Team of America that same year.

Club America
On 29 May 2014, Goltz signed with Mexican club América. On May 29, 2014, the transfer of Goltz to Club América was confirmed, where he signed for three seasons for a figure of around 1.2 million dollars.

On December 14, 2014, América was established as champion of the Apertura Tournament. 2014 of Liga MX. He was praised by many Club America for being a brave and tough defender for the team.

In his first season with the club, Goltz won the Apertura championship and the 2014–15 CONCACAF Champions League.

In the Apertura 2016 Liga MX Final vs Tigres, he was wrongly sent off at the 105th minute during a massive brawl and he went off upset.

Boca Juniors
On July 6, 2017, Paolo Goltz signed his three-year contract with Boca Juniors of Argentina, thus being the first reinforcement of said club for the La Boca team. He quickly became the two starters of Boca Juniors and formalized an even defense with Magallán. In 2018, due to his poor performance and the hiring of Izquierdoz in the winter market, he began to lose ground in the first team, until, with the arrival of Lisandro López on loan in 2019, Goltz lost the title. On July 24, 2019, Paolo Goltz would return as a starter after a long inactivity, he would be firm and sure in Boca's 0-1 victory over Athletico Paranaense for the round of 16 of the Copa Libertadores 2019.

Honours
Lanús
Copa Sudamericana: 2013

América
Liga MX: Apertura 2014
CONCACAF Champions League: 2014–15, 2015–16

Boca Juniors
Argentine Primera División: 2017–18
Supercopa Argentina: 2018

References

External links

1985 births
Living people
People from Paraná Department
Argentine people of German descent
Argentina international footballers
Association football defenders
Argentine footballers
Club Atlético Huracán footballers
Club Atlético Lanús footballers
Club América footballers
Boca Juniors footballers
Club de Gimnasia y Esgrima La Plata footballers
Club Atlético Colón footballers
Argentine Primera División players
Liga MX players
Expatriate footballers in Mexico
Argentine expatriate sportspeople in Mexico
Sportspeople from Entre Ríos Province